Yokoi is Japanese surname. Notable people with the surname include:

Gunpei Yokoi, designer of the Game Boy and other Nintendo products
Hirotaka Yokoi, professional mixed martial arts fighter
Shoichi Yokoi, soldier and celebrity
Shonan Yokoi, political reformer
Mitsuo Yokoi, a Japanese voice actor (known as "Tesshō Genda")
Yokoi Yayū, 18th-century poet

Japanese-language surnames